Lohardaga is an assembly constituency in the Indian state of Jharkhand.

Members of Legislative Assembly

Election results

2019

See also
Vidhan Sabha
List of states of India by type of legislature

References

Assembly constituencies of Jharkhand